Janus (Ianus) Laurentius Jørgensen Ridter (14 August 1854 – 30 November 1921) was a Danish painter and illustrator. He is remembered above all for his illustrations of Danish industrial establishments in the 1880s and his topographical watercolours and drawings of Copenhagen in the 1890s and 1900s.

Early life
Ridter was born in Aakirkeby on the island of Bornholm as the son of taylor Jørgen Ridder and his wife Cecilie Margrethe Larsdatter. He apprenticed  as a book seller but from an early age practiced his talent for painting and drawing.

Career
In 1874, Illustreret Tidende accepted a few of his drawings and from 1887 he worked full-time as an artist. In 1892, he enrolled at Copenhagen Technical School and also studied privately with the painter Carl Martin Soya-Jensen. He was admitted to the Royal Danish Academy of Fine Arts in November 1893 was a student there until January 1897.

Ridter created numerous watercolours from Copenhagen. From 1905 Ridter commenced his career as illustrator for  C. Ferslew & Co.'s publications (De Ferslewske Blade), especially Aftenposten where he worked from 1906 to 1915.

He died in 1921 and is buried at Bispebjerg Cemetery.

Works
Together with Johan Thorsø, Ridter created the illustrations of Danish industrial enterprises in Danmarks industrielle Etablissementer which was published in 1887–89.

Many of Ridter's watercolours are preserved in the collections of Museum of Copenhagen and Øregård Museum.

Gallery

See also
 Christian Bayer
 Alex Vincents Kunstforlag

References

External links

 J. L. Ridter at Kunstindeks Danmark
 Postcards by J. L. Ridter
 Qorks by H. L. Ridter in Danish museums and archives
 Source

1854 births
1921 deaths
Danish cityscape artists
Danish painters
19th-century Danish illustrators
20th-century Danish illustrators
People from Bornholm
People from Copenhagen
Burials at East Bispebjerg Cemetery